Með nöktum (With The Naked) was a short-lived Icelandic new wave band from the 1980s. After the demise of the occult post-punk band Þeyr, their vocalist Magnús Guðmundsson went on to form a group which continued the musical style of Þeyr. They only released one album in 1985 titled Skemmtun and split up just a short time afterwards.

Musically it follows the path of Þeyr's The Fourth Reich and the "Lunaire" single.

References

External links
Video clip of “Emotional Swing” at YouTube.com
Page about Halldór Lárusson at trommari.is (in Icelandic)

Icelandic new wave musical groups
Musical groups established in 1985
Icelandic post-punk music groups
Icelandic punk rock groups
Musical groups from Reykjavík
1985 establishments in Iceland